Fairview or Fairview Estate is a rural settlement in the Western Bay of Plenty District and Bay of Plenty Region of New Zealand's North Island. It is about 5.5 km south of Katikati, and is marketed as a lifestyle subdivision.

Demographics
It is part of the wider Aongatete statistical area.

Fairview had a population of 297 at the 2018 New Zealand census, an increase of 246 people (482.4%) since the 2013 census, and an increase of 261 people (725.0%) since the 2006 census. There were 144 households, comprising 141 males and 156 females, giving a sex ratio of 0.9 males per female, with 12 people (4.0%) aged under 15 years, 3 (1.0%) aged 15 to 29, 72 (24.2%) aged 30 to 64, and 210 (70.7%) aged 65 or older.

Ethnicities were 94.9% European/Pākehā, 4.0% Māori, 3.0% Asian, and 1.0% other ethnicities. People may identify with more than one ethnicity.

Although some people chose not to answer the census's question about religious affiliation, 33.3% had no religion, and 54.5% were Christian.

Of those at least 15 years old, 36 (12.6%) people had a bachelor's or higher degree, and 72 (25.3%) people had no formal qualifications. 24 people (8.4%) earned over $70,000 compared to 17.2% nationally. The employment status of those at least 15 was that 39 (13.7%) people were employed full-time, 42 (14.7%) were part-time, and 6 (2.1%) were unemployed.

Notable people
Glyn Tucker, musician.

References

Western Bay of Plenty District
Populated places in the Bay of Plenty Region
Populated places around the Tauranga Harbour